The women's javelin throw event at the 1999 Summer Universiade was held on 11 July at the Estadio Son Moix in Palma de Mallorca, Spain. It was the first time the new model javelin was used for this event.

Results

References

Athletics at the 1999 Summer Universiade
1999 in women's athletics
1999